Michaela Paštiková (born 27 March 1980) is a retired tennis player from the Czech Republic.

On 31 January 2005, Paštiková achieved her career-high singles ranking of world No. 89. On  25 July 2005, she peaked at No. 35 of the WTA doubles rankings.

Her father introduced her to the game at age three and she was coached by Jiri Fencl. Paštiková preferred playing on clay surfaces. Father, Vladimir, is a teacher and tennis coach, mother, Zdena, is a nurse; Michaela has a younger sister named Marketa.

Paštiková retired from professional tennis 2014.

WTA career finals

Doubles: 4 (1 title, 3 runner-ups)

ITF Circuit finals

Singles: 13 (8–5)

Doubles: 45 (19–26)

External links
 
 
 

1980 births
Living people
People from Šumperk
Czech female tennis players
Australian Open (tennis) junior champions
Grand Slam (tennis) champions in girls' doubles
Sportspeople from the Olomouc Region